Kandalan or Kondelan may refer to:
 Kondelan, Isfahan
 Kandalan, Kurdistan